Melisende of Tripoli (fl. around 1160) was the daughter of Hodierna of Tripoli and Raymond II, count of Tripoli.

Biography 
Melisende was named for her aunt, Melisende, Queen of Jerusalem. She was a cousin of Kings Baldwin III and Amalric I.

Melisende's parents bickered constantly, and there were rumors that Raymond was not her father. During a particularly intense dispute in 1152 the family called Queen Melisende and her son Baldwin III from Jerusalem to intervene, and the conflict was resolved, though Raymond was killed by the Hashshashin directly afterwards. His territory was left to his wife until their son Raymond III (Melisende's brother) reached majority.

Melisende and Raymond were close, and in 1160, when Byzantine Emperor Manuel I Comnenus asked for a new wife from the Crusader states, Raymond and his cousin Baldwin III tried to arrange a marriage between Melisende and the Emperor. Hodierna, Raymond, Queen Melisende, and Baldwin raised a huge dowry in anticipation of the marriage to Manuel, "prepared at vast expense and with great zeal", which "surpassed the luxury of kings", according to the medieval historian William of Tyre. The gifts were to be sent on 12 galleys equipped by Raymond. However, Manuel's ambassadors thoroughly investigated both his potential brides, causing a delay of a year, to the great annoyance of Melisende's relatives. The negotiations fell through, but William did not know why; he reports simply that Manuel had been secretly negotiating with the Principality of Antioch at the same time and chose to marry Maria of Antioch instead.

It is likely that Constance, Maria's mother and regent of Antioch, had requested assistance from Manuel in the absence of her husband Raynald of Châtillon, who had been taken captive in Aleppo. It is also likely that Manuel's ambassadors heard of the rumors of Melisende's illegitimacy, and John Cinnamus records that although Melisende was beautiful, she was not healthy. Baldwin III did not want the Byzantine Empire to extend its direct control over Antioch, but agreed to the marriage when he learned of the negotiations. Raymond, however, felt both he and his sister had been insulted, and paid pirates to raid the Byzantine island of Cyprus. After being spurned by the Emperor, Melisende could find no other husband and instead entered a convent, where she died fairly young.

Cultural references
The French dramatist Edmond Rostand made Melisende the main character in his verse drama La Princesse Lointaine, in which she was played by Sarah Bernhardt. The work tells the story of the troubadour Jaufré Rudel's "love from afar" for the lady of Tripoli, however, most versions of the tale have Melisende's mother Hodierna as Rudel's desired.

Sources
William of Tyre, A History of Deeds Done Beyond the Sea, trans. E.A. Babcock and A.C. Krey. Columbia University Press, 1943.

12th-century births
12th-century deaths
Women of the Crusader states